Dennis Flores may refer to: 
Dennis Flores (soccer) (born 1993), American soccer player
Dennis Flores (activist), Puerto Rican activist